This is the list of schools in the London Borough of Waltham Forest, England.

State-funded schools

Primary schools

Ainslie Wood Primary School 
Barclay Primary School
Barn Croft Primary School 
Beaumont Primary School
Buxton School
Chapel End Infants' School 
Chapel End Junior Academy
Chase Lane Primary School 
Chingford CE Primary School
Coppermill Primary School
Davies Lane Primary School 
Dawlish Primary School 
Downsell Primary School
Edinburgh Primary School
Emmanuel Community School
George Mitchell School
George Tomlinson Primary School 
Greenleaf Primary School 
Gwyn Jones Primary School 
Handsworth Primary School 
Henry Maynard Primary School
Hillyfield Primary Academy
The Jenny Hammond Primary School
Lime Academy Larkswood
Longshaw Primary Academy 
Mayville Primary School 
Mission Grove Primary School 
Newport School 
Oakhill Primary School 
Our Lady & St George's RC Primary School
Parkside Primary School
Riverley Primary School
Roger Ascham Primary School 
St Joseph's RC Infant School 
St Joseph's RC Junior School
St Mary's RC Primary School
St Mary's CE Primary School
St Patrick's RC Primary School 
St Saviour's CE Primary School
Salisbury Manor Primary School
Selwyn Primary School
South Grove Primary School 
Stoneydown Park School 
Sybourn Primary School
Thomas Gamuel Primary School 
Thorpe Hall Primary School
Walthamstow Primary Academy
Whitehall Primary School 
Whittingham Primary Academy 
Willow Brook Primary
The Winns Primary School 
Woodford Green Primary School
The Woodside Primary Academy
Yardley Primary School

Secondary schools

 Buxton School
 Chingford Foundation School
 Connaught School for Girls
 Eden Girls' School, Waltham Forest
 Frederick Bremer School
 George Mitchell School
 Heathcote School
 Highams Park School
 Holy Family Catholic School
 Kelmscott School
 Lammas School
 Leytonstone School
 Norlington School
 South Chingford Foundation School
 Walthamstow Academy
 Walthamstow School for Girls
 Willowfield School

Special and alternative schools
 Belmont Park School
 Burnside Secondary PRU
 Hawkswood Primary PRU
 Hawkswood (Therapeutic)
 Joseph Clarke School
 Lime Academy Hornbeam
 Whitefield Schools

Further education
 Big Creative Academy
 Leyton Sixth Form College 
 Sir George Monoux College
 Waltham Forest College

Independent schools

Primary and preparatory schools
 Noor Ul Islam Primary School
 Walthamstow Montessori School

Senior and all-through schools
 Big Creative Independent School
 Forest School
 Lantern of Knowledge Secondary School
 Normanhurst School

References 

Waltham Forest
Schools in the London Borough of Waltham Forest
London